(Translation: The dwarf and the witch, English title: King Dick) is a 1973 Italian adult animated film.

Plot

A tyrannical King - Charles the Impotent - has taken over the Kingdom. During Charles's terrible reign; Master Limpcock is having a difficult sex life with his wife, Erotica. Erotica suggests a potion to Limpcock to cure his erectile dysfunction. She is soon left alone, and invites a young servant man to have sex with her. The two are being watched through the keyhole by Little Dick (the "King Dick" of the title), a young servant dwarf, who has been instructed by Limpcock to send a message to Nymphomania, a sexually-inadequate witch, who concocts a spell that will hopefully make herself beautiful again.

Nymphomania's Crystal Ball comes to terms of helping her to regain her beauty, only if she receives sixty-nine orgasms during sexual intercourse. She decides to test this out on Little Dick when he arrives, and is accompanied by Aphrodisiac, a wisecracking talking red frog (initially used as one of Nymphomania's ingredients), who helps her to keep track of the number of orgasms she receives each time she has sex. Once Little Dick is knocked out; Nymphomania transforms into a beautiful woman, but returns to her original form, as she has not received enough orgasms to fully break the spell.

She goes to see Master Limpcock, and makes a deal that she can help cure his impotence, but only on one condition: that she keeps Little Dick all for herself. Limpcock agrees, and the well-endowed dwarf - attempting to escape from Nymphomania's clutches, and also from the equally desperate Erotica - successfully escapes, but runs into trouble with some coachmen. He soon finds a job as a stablehand at the town's circus, cleaning an elephant, who frequently flatulates and defecates on people. Little Dick soon starts to miss Nymphomania, as he would rather be with her than be at the circus.

Meanwhile, after a few failed attempts; Aphrodisiac manages to get the Crystal Ball to signal again by consuming some fireflies, and he helps Nymphomania and Little Dick to reunite, whilst also curing the King's impotence. She also casts acrobatic spells on Little Dick, which causes him to grow erections that reach extreme lengths. This amazes the circus crowd, and an obese female circus participant - Miss Lulu Lashers, a tightrope walker - runs after the little dwarf, so she can have sex with him. To prevent this from happening; Nymphomania races to rescue Little Dick, followed by Aphrodisiac with the Crystal Ball.

She reunites with Little Dick, and successfully has more sexual intercourse with him. Like last time; she turns into a beautiful woman for a short period of time, unbeknownst by Little Dick, due to being unconscious from the exhaustion of having rough sex with her. The crowd - appalled by Nymphomania's ugliness - boo away the witch, before Lulu the obese tightrope-walker soon causes the whole circus to collapse. Nymphomania then tries to catch Little Dick - who had just started to escape from the circus - for more sex. They arrive at a cemetery, and Little Dick falls into a large tomb.

He then has a nightmare about him being led to a grand hall where an orgy session has been held, with Limpcock and Erotica being among the people attending. He later arrives at an olympics stadium where a race has been held. He unintentionally races, finishes first, and is rewarded. The prize-giver is later revealed to be Nymphomania, who leads the dwarf to the dungeon to have more intercourse. He starts having nasty thoughts about being surrounded by multiple Nymphomanias, and then encounters a snake charmer, who extends Little Dick's penis, which gets run over by a gladiator cart.

Little Dick then wakes up, and - once again - finds himself having more sexual intercourse with Nymphomania before escaping from her again. He then finds himself in a forest where he encounters the legendary Robin Hood and his Merry Men, who rescue him from a wild boar, which they eat during a camping evening. During that evening; Robin Hood tells him about Charles the Impotent, who instructed Fartface - a villainous witch - to murder Robin Hood's brother-in-law King Richard (Big Dick) and his son Friday the 13th to end the Royal Line, so that Charles can become King of England.

Robin Hood decides to start a revolution against the tyrannical King, he hasn't a bell to sound the alarm, so he insists that Little Dick steals one from the church, The Holy Passion. Little Dick disguises as a little girl to confess sins, and is led to a school of nuns. Aphrodisiac hears all of this, and informs Nymphomania, who soon spots the dwarf, and sneaks into the church cellar, through a dungeon, and into a workshop where two Blacksmiths invented a special chastity belt, which they decide to test on Nymphomania when she immediately arrives. Nymphomania spots Little Dick 
being treated by the Mother Superior (head of the nuns), who - now aware of the dwarf's disguise - stiffens Little Dick's penis using a formula, Nymphomania successfully breaks off the chastity belt when she and Little Dick continue to have sex.

Nymphomania, Aphrodisiac and Little Dick escape, and they ring the bells of the church, much to the delight of Robin Hood and the Merry Men, who celebrate with a feast, and decide to hold the Revolution till the following day. Little Dick escapes Nymphomania; he joins the celebration, gets drunk, and has more intercourse with her once she catches up.

The day of the revolution against Charles arrives, and Robin Hood becomes startled when he hears that Charles has declared a law against fornication. The famous outlaw forms a mob. Meanwhile, after escaping (this time, unintentionally) yet again from Nymphomania; he crashes into Master Limpcock's castle. Limpcock - much obliged to see Little Dick - congratulates the young dwarf for helping to cure his impotence, and reveals the note he had to send to Nymphomania earlier own. He explains that now Little Dick has reaches twenty years old; he is now an eligible heir to the thrown, and that Nymphomania is the daughter of FartFace, who was cursed by an evil wizard.

Robin Hood and the Merry Men defeat Charles, and discover that Little Dick is part of the Royal Line through the birthmark on his left buttock, which was exposed when he and Nymphomania were having sex in a nearby stable.

Nymphomania eventually reaches her sixty-ninth orgasm, she transforms into her beautiful form again - this time - without changing back, and Little Dick becomes a handsome prince. The two lovers get married, but on their wedding night; they learn that Prince Dick has now been given the same erectile dysfunction predicament as Master Limpcock. Nymphomania's Crystal Ball rectifies this, but explains that they must sacrifice their beauty, and return to their original forms. They agree, and - being much more accepting of each-other's appearances - have a much more positive sex life. They live happily ever after and have many well-endowed children.

English dubs 
The film was released in three forms in English, one version of the film was a direct dub of the Italian version, with a few quick cuts, this version was released in theatres and on VHS in the UK in the 80s, the second version was on the VHS Dirty Little Adult Cartoons, Vol. 2, with German subtitles, the dubbing was done in-house, most of which is improvised and doesn't match the mouth movements as well as the first dub, the third version was a 1987 porn VHS called Sheena in Wonderland, which featured the same version as Dirty Little Adult Cartoons, Vol. 2 except with the female lead commenting on the film throughout, with scenes of the host having sex with other men throughout.

Response 
The film was unsuccessful when it first came out in cinemas, but gained a mild cult following in the UK after being released on video.

References

External links 
 

1973 films
Animated comedy films
1970s Italian-language films
Italian animated films
Pornographic animation
Films scored by Lallo Gori
Adult animated films
1970s Italian films